Mandan Public School District 1, also called Mandan Public Schools, is a school district headquartered in Mandan, North Dakota.

Located in Morton County, it serves Mandan and Harmon. The district takes high school students from the Sweet Briar School District.

History
In 1974 the district sold $90,000 of bonds so it could build a vocational center at its secondary facility. In 1981 the district was considering adding an expansion of its elementary school. That year the district's board of education decided not to sell interest bids and opted to have a new set of bids opened.

In 1981 the North Dakota Supreme Court was deliberating whether the district and the New Salem School District could receive funds from coal impact money from the state, with the definition of a "tipple" being a determining factor.

Schools
 Secondary schools
Mandan High School
Mandan Middle School

 Elementary schools
 Custer
 Fort Lincoln
 Lewis and Clark
 Red Trail
 Roosevelt
 Mary Stark

 Alternative schools
 B. C. Academy (9-12)
 Mandan Virtual Academy

References

External links
 Mandan Public Schools
School districts in North Dakota
Education in Morton County, North Dakota